Juraj Czinege (born 29 October 1977 in Bratislava) is a former Slovak footballer who played as a midfielder. He is currently coaching PŠC Pezinok B.

Club career
Czinege spent two seasons in the Turkish Super Lig with Elazığspor, one season in the Gambrinus Liga with 1. FC Slovácko and one season in the Greek Super League with Iraklis FC. Then, he played for SV Mattersburg Amateurs in the Austrian Regional League East and FC ŠTK 1914 Šamorín. He ended his career at SV Gols in the Austrian II. Liga Nord.

International career
Czinege made four appearances for the senior Slovakia national football team in 2002. He represented and captained Slovakia at the 2000 Summer Olympics in Australia.

Style of play
Czinege was known as a free kick specialist. Mainly a central midfielder, he also played on the right wing.

References

External links
Guardian's Stats Centre

1977 births
Living people
Footballers from Bratislava
Slovak footballers
Slovak football managers
Slovakia international footballers
Slovakia under-21 international footballers
Slovak expatriate footballers
AS Trenčín players
Slovak expatriate sportspeople in Greece
FC Petržalka players
Slovak expatriate sportspeople in Austria
FK Inter Bratislava players
Expatriate footballers in Austria
1. FC Slovácko players
Expatriate footballers in Turkey
Elazığspor footballers
Slovak expatriate sportspeople in Turkey
Iraklis Thessaloniki F.C. players
Expatriate footballers in Greece
Footballers at the 2000 Summer Olympics
Olympic footballers of Slovakia
Slovak Super Liga players
Slovak expatriate sportspeople in the Czech Republic
Süper Lig players
Expatriate footballers in the Czech Republic
Super League Greece players
Association football midfielders